SDF2, Sdf2, SDF-2, Sdf-2 may represent:

 Syntax Definition Formalism 2 (SDF2)
 Stromal cell-derived factor-1 (SDF-1, SDF1, Sdf1)
 Stromal cell-derived factor-1 alpha (SDF-1a, SDF1a, Sdf1α)
 Stromal cell-derived factor-2 (SDF-2, SDF2, Sdf2)
 Stromal cell-derived factor-3 (SDF-3, SDF3, Sdf3)
 Stromal cell-derived factor-4 (SDF-4, SDF4, Sdf4)
 SDF-2, a fictional spaceship from the Robotech saga.
 SDF-2 Megaroad-01, a fictional spaceship from Macross, a Japanese television series
 Screen Definition Facility II (SDF II), a software tool from IBM for the interactive development of screen definition panels.